Kothuru may refer to:

Kothuru, Krishna, a village in Andhra Pradesh, India
Kothuru, Srikakulam, a town in Andhra Pradesh, India
Kothuru, West Godavari district, a village in Andhra Pradesh, India